In theoretical physics, ABJM theory is a quantum field theory studied by Ofer Aharony, Oren Bergman, Daniel Jafferis, and Juan Maldacena. The ABJM theory is also closely related to Chern–Simons theory, and it serves as a useful toy model for solving problems that arise in condensed matter physics. It is a theory defined on  superspace.

See also

 6D (2,0) superconformal field theory

Notes

References

 

 

Conformal field theory
Supersymmetric quantum field theory
String theory